Tessarabrachion is a monotypic genus of species of krill, containing only the species Tessarabrachion oculatus.

References 

Krill
Monotypic crustacean genera
Taxa named by Hans Jacob Hansen